James Broadhurst (born 1 December 1987) is a former New Zealand rugby union lock who played provincial rugby for Taranaki, Super Rugby for the Hurricanes, and for the All Blacks. He was also a national representative at the under-19 and under-21 levels.

Broadhurst was born in Kaitaia and educated at Campion College in Gisborne.

Broadhurst made his debut for New Zealand on 25 July 2015 against South Africa but was subbed off at half-time. In September that year Broadhurst received two serious head knocks while representing Taranaki and was taken off the field due to concussion. Broadhurst has not played a game of rugby since then, with symptoms of concussion still ongoing for him as of early 2017.

His brother is Japan rugby player Michael Broadhurst.

He retired in April 2017 after failing to recover from the ongoing effects of concussion.

References

External links
James Broadhurst at AllBlacks.com
Taranaki RFU profile
Hurricanes profile

1987 births
Living people
New Zealand rugby union players
Hurricanes (rugby union) players
Rugby union locks
Canterbury rugby union players
Taranaki rugby union players
People educated at Campion College, Gisborne
Rugby union players from Gisborne, New Zealand
People from Kaitaia
New Zealand international rugby union players